"A Change Is Gonna Come" is a song by Sam Cooke.

A Change Is Gonna Come may also refer to:

 A Change Is Gonna Come (Leela James album)
 A Change Is Gonna Come (Jack McDuff album), 1966
 "A Change Is Gonna Come" (The West Wing), title of an episode in the West Wing television series, in which the song was performed by James Taylor
 "A Change Is Gonna Come" (Grey's Anatomy)
 "Change Is Gonna Come", a song by Olly Murs from Olly Murs
 "A Change Is Gonna Cum", a song by Devo from Smooth Noodle Maps